is an underground rapid transit line in Osaka, Japan. It is one of the lines of Osaka Metro. It links the northwestern district of Fukushima-ku and the southeastern district of Ikuno-ku with the central commercial and entertainment district of Namba. The line is paralleled by the underground Kintetsu Namba Line/Hanshin Namba Line connection line in its central section. Station numbers are indicated by the letter S.

Platform screen doors are located at all of the stations. The first station, Minami-Tatsumi, had them installed on March 14, 2014 and operation started in April. The final station, Nodahanshin, had them installed and operating in December. All platforms are long enough for eight-car trains however a part of each platform has been blocked off, since only four-car trains are needed to carry the amount of traffic on the line. In 2013 the line carried on average 181,238 passengers per day.

History
16 April 1969 – Nodahanshin – Sakuragawa (opening)
25 July 1969 – Tanimachi Kyūchōme – Imazato (opening)
10 September 1969 – Imazato – Shin-Fukae (opening)
11 March 1970 – Sakuragawa – Tanimachi Kyūchōme (opening)
2 December 1981 – Shin-Fukae – Minami-Tatsumi (opening)

Stations

Rolling stock

Current
 25 series (since 1991)
As there is no dedicated rolling stock depot on the Sennichimae Line, trains are transferred to Morinomiya Depot on the Chūō Line via a connecting track at Awaza.

Former
 50 series (1969–1994)
 100 series (later version) (1979–1989)
 30 series (1991–1995)

References

Osaka Metro
Rail transport in Osaka Prefecture
Railway lines opened in 1969
750 V DC railway electrification
1969 establishments in Japan